The Royal Order of Kapiʻolani (Kapiʻolani e Hoʻokanaka) was instituted on August 30, 1880 by King Kalākaua to recognize services in the cause of humanity, for merit in Science and the Arts, or for special services rendered to the Kingdom of Hawaiʻi. He named the Order in honor of his ancestor High Chiefess Kapiʻolani the Great, an early exponent of Christianity in the Hawaiian Islands. It also honored his wife Queen Kapiʻolani, the namesake of the first Kapiʻolani.  This Order was awarded 177 times in all grades during Kalākaua's reign, and three more times by his successor, Queen Liliʻuokalani. The last award of the Order took place on 2 June 1892; in 1893 the Order became abeyant.

Grades 
The Order was awarded in six grades. Granting the insignia and awards of the Order was determined by the number of living members of the Order.  At any given time there could only be:
 Grand Cross – 12 recipients
 High Grand Officer – 15 recipients
 Grand Officer – 20 recipients
 Commander – 30 recipients
 Officer – 50 recipients
 Companion (Knight) – 60 recipients
 Medal of Honor – no limit to recipients, 1st (silver) and 2nd-degree (bronze)

Insignia of the Order

Grand Cross 

The insignia of the Grand Cross includes the badge, breast star and grand cordon.

The Order's badge comprises a red enameled gold Maltese cross, surmounted by a gold Hawaiian crown. Between the arms of the cross are gold Hawaiian crowns in angles.  A center disc of red and white enamel displays a gold double-K monogram, surrounded by a white enamel band, on which is inscribed "KULIA I KANUU" – "Strive to Reach the Summit". At end of the cross is a small, gold locket with the portrait of Queen Kapiʻolani. On the reverse is a single red disc, with the motto "KULIA".

The star of the Grand Cross of Order is an octagonal silver star, on which is superimposed the badge without the surmounted crown.

The grand cordon is yellow, bordered by narrow stripes of the colors the Hawaiian flag: white, red and dark-blue. The badge is fastened to the sash's bow and rests on the hip.

High Grand Officer 
High Grand Officers bear the same insignia as the Grand Cross, except the badge is not worn on a sash, rather on a neck ribbon of alternating yellow and red strips.

Grand Officer 
Grand Officers wear only the breast star.

Commander 
The insignia of Commander is identical to that of Grand Cross, except the Commander wears only the sash.  In addition, on the badge the crowns between the arms of the cross are silver, not gold.

Officer & Companion 
The Officer and Companion cross use an identical badge to that of the Commander, albeit markedly smaller in size.  These decorations are breast badges suspended by the badge's crown on a riband of alternating yellow and red stripes.  A rosette is affixed to the riband of the Officer cross.

Medals of Honor 
The Medals of Honor are similar to the Companion cross; however they lack the crowns between the arms of the cross and the badge's crown surmounting the cross.  The medal of the 1st-degree is made of silver, and the 2nd-degree of bronze.

Annuity 
Along with being granted insignia of the Order, an annuity was given to the recipients:  $150 for the Grand Cross, $130 for the Grand High Officer, $125 for the Grand Officer, $100 for the Commander, $75 for the Officer and $50 for the Companion.

Recipients 
The first recipient of the Royal Order of Kapiʻolani was Auguste Jean Baptiste Marques.  He was made Commander in  1880.

Dr. Charles M. Newell, of Boston wrote several romantic novels about the Hawaiian Islands in the late 19th century, including Kalani of Oahu (1881), Kamehameha the Conquering King (1885) and The Voyage of the Fleetwing (1886) and The Isle of Palms (1888). His Companion is believed awarded in 1885 and was sold by Cowans Auctions in 2010.

Queen Natalie of Serbia was awarded the Grand Cross on 28 June 1883.

The Saint Marianne of Molokaʻi (born Maria Anna Barbara Koob) was awarded the Companion on November 9, 1885, for her work in Hawaiian hospitals and the Hansens Disease (Leprosy) settlement of Kalaupapa.

Dr. Eduard Arning, British-German bacteriologist, was awarded the Companion in 1886 for research in Hansens Disease.

Notes

References 
 Medcalf, Donald & Ronald Russell (1978). Hawaiian Money: Standard Catalog: Includes Tokens, Medals & Royal Orders. Honolulu: Nani Stamp & Coin LTD. .
 Werlich, Robert (1965). Orders & Decorations of All Nations: Ancient & Modern, Civil & Military. Quaker Press. .

Further reading 

Hawaiian Kingdom
Hawaii culture
Kapiolani
Awards established in 1880
1880 establishments in Hawaii
1893 disestablishments in Hawaii
Awards disestablished in 1893